The 1973 King's Cup finals were held from December 16 until December 25, 1973, once again in Bangkok. This was the 6th edition of the international football competition. Some results are not clear of the outcome.

The tournaments format was changed once again and reverted to two groups of three teams.

The Groups
Two groups of four teams.
Winners and runner up qualifies for the semi-finals.

Fixtures and results

Group A

Group B

Semi-finals

3rd-place match

Final

Winner

External links
RSSSF

King's Cup
Kings Cup, 1973
Kings Cup, 1973